James Rankin (8 September 1927 – 1985) was an English professional footballer who played as a winger.

References

1927 births
1985 deaths
Footballers from Gateshead
English footballers
Association football wingers
Newcastle United F.C. players
Brighton & Hove Albion F.C. players
Grimsby Town F.C. players
English Football League players